The Pea Ridge School Building is a historic schoolhouse in rural southern Marion County, Arkansas. It is a single-story wood-frame structure, with a gable roof, board and batten siding, and a stone foundation. The main facade faces west, and has a pair of doorways with a sash window between. The interior is finished in horizontal boards, those on the east painted black to provide a blackboard. Built c. 1899, it is one of Marion County's least-altered one-room schoolhouses, having only lost its belfry when the tin roof was installed in the 1920s.

The building was listed on the National Register of Historic Places in 1993.

See also
National Register of Historic Places listings in Marion County, Arkansas

References

School buildings on the National Register of Historic Places in Arkansas
One-room schoolhouses in Arkansas
School buildings completed in 1899
Schools in Marion County, Arkansas
National Register of Historic Places in Marion County, Arkansas
1899 establishments in Arkansas